Narong Sangkasuwan (born 19 October 1943) is a Thai former footballer who competed in the 1968 Summer Olympics.

References

External links
 

1943 births
Living people
Narong Sangkasuwan
Narong Sangkasuwan
Footballers at the 1968 Summer Olympics
1972 AFC Asian Cup players
Southeast Asian Games medalists in football
Narong Sangkasuwan
Association football defenders
Competitors at the 1967 Southeast Asian Peninsular Games
Narong Sangkasuwan